Scandium sulfide can refer to two different sulfides of scandium:

 Scandium monosulfide, ScS
 Scandium(III) sulfide, Sc2S3

Detailed information on each of these compounds is found on the specific pages linked above.